is a Japanese comedian, television presenter and television writer who performs boke of the comedy duo Cream Stew. His partner is Shinya Ueda.

Arita is represented by Natural Eight.

Impressions
Animal Hamaguchi
Antonio Inoki
Kensuke Sasaki
Nobuhiko Takada (also under his Generalissimo Takada persona)
Riki Choshu
Genichiro Tenryu
Yuji Nagata
Manabu Nakanishi
Hiroshi Fujioka
Tatsumi Fujinami
San'yūtei Enraku V

Filmography
The lists below only features Arita himself. To see his appearances with the comedy duo, see Cream Stew (comedy duo).

Current appearances

Former appearances

TV drama

Films

Anime television

Anime films

Internet

Advertisements

Music videos

Magazines

Works

DVD

Books

References

Notes

See also
Cream Stew (comedy duo)
Shinya Ueda

External links
 

Japanese impressionists (entertainers)
Japanese television presenters
Japanese male actors
Rikkyo University alumni
People from Kumamoto
1971 births
Living people